Galvezia lanceolata is a species of plant in the family Plantaginaceae. It is endemic to Ecuador.

References

Plantaginaceae
Endemic flora of Ecuador
Vulnerable plants
Taxonomy articles created by Polbot